Night of the Living Rerun is an original novel based on the U.S. television series Buffy the Vampire Slayer.

Plot summary

In 1692, in Salem, Massachusetts, the Despised One was raised from the Otherworld and Samantha Kane, that generation's Slayer, died while defeating it. Now in 1997, the Master is trying to have history repeat itself with a different ending. The spirits of the people responsible for the rise of the Despised One in 1692 are now inhabiting the bodies of Buffy and her friends. Buffy must stop the ritual from happening or the Master will rise from his prison below Sunnydale.

Continuity
The novel takes place during the first season of Buffy, sometime between "Angel" and "Prophecy Girl".

External links

Reviews
Litefoot1969.bravepages.com - Review of this book by Litefoot
Teen-books.com - Reviews of this book
Nika-summers.com - Review of this book by Nika Summers
Shadowcat.name - Review of this book

1998 novels
1990s horror novels
Books based on Buffy the Vampire Slayer
Fiction set in the 1690s
Fiction set in 1997
Novels set in the 1690s
Novels set in the 1990s
Novels set in California